The Belhaven Commercial Historic District encompasses a portion of the downtown area of Belhaven, North Carolina, that was developed between about 1910 and 1965.  Located on one block of Pamlico and two of East Main Street, it includes thirteen buildings from that time period.  Most of them are built of brick, and are one or two stories in height.  The Cameo Theater (c. 1915) is a three-story structure in the district.

The district was listed on the National Register of Historic Places in 2015.

See also
National Register of Historic Places listings in Beaufort County, North Carolina

References

Historic districts on the National Register of Historic Places in North Carolina
Buildings and structures in Beaufort County, North Carolina
National Register of Historic Places in Beaufort County, North Carolina